The Porangatu Microregion is a statistical region created by IBGE  (Instituto Brasileiro de Geografia e Economia) in north-central Goiás state, Brazil.  The most important city is Porangatu.

Municipalities 
The microregion consists of the following municipalities:
Alto Horizonte 
Amaralina 
Bonópolis 
Campinaçu 
Campinorte 
Campos Verdes 
Estrela do Norte 
Formoso 
Mara Rosa 
Minaçu 
Montividiu do Norte 
Mutunópolis 
Niquelândia 
Nova Iguaçu de Goiás 
Porangatu 
Santa Tereza de Goiás 
Santa Terezinha de Goiás 
Trombas 
Uruaçu

See also
List of municipalities in Goiás
Microregions of Goiás

References

Microregions of Goiás